Heidi Pedersen (born 19 November 1979) is a retired Norwegian football striker.

She played youth football for Clausenengen FK when first called up to Norway's national youth team. She made her senior debut for Trondheims-Ørn in 1998, playing ten seasons.

She was capped fifteen times and scored five times for the Norway women's national football team.

References

1979 births
Living people
Sportspeople from Kristiansund
Norwegian women's footballers
SK Trondheims-Ørn players
Toppserien players
Norway women's youth international footballers
Norway women's international footballers
Women's association football forwards